J. Fuller was a publisher in 18th-century England.

Publications

"A Lover of the Mathematics". A Mathematical Miscellany in Four Parts. 2nd ed., S. Fuller, Dublin, 1735. The First Part is: An Essay towards the Probable Solution of the Forty five Surprising PARADOXES, in GORDON's Geography.
Gentleman's Diary or The Mathematical Repository (1741-1745)

English publishers (people)
Businesspeople from Dublin (city)